Laurent Dona Fologo (12 December 1939 – 5 February 2021) was an Ivorian politician.

Biography
Fologo attended the École supérieure de journalisme de Lille, and subsequently became Editor-in-Chief of the newspaper Fraternité Matin. He then served in various ministerial positions in the cabinet of Félix Houphouët-Boigny and became Secretary General of the Democratic Party of Ivory Coast (PCDI). During the First Ivorian Civil War, he helped to participate in the negotiations between Togo and the Economic Community of West African States. Additionally, he served as President of the  until 19 May 2011.

Laurent Dona Fologi died in Abidjan on 5 February 2021 at the age of 81 from COVID-19.

References

1939 births
2021 deaths
Ivorian politicians
Deaths from the COVID-19 pandemic in Ivory Coast